TRNA methyltransferase 13 homolog is a protein that in humans is encoded by the TRMT13 gene.

References

Further reading